Heracleides of Mylasa was citizen of Mylasa in Caria, who commanded the Carian Greeks in their successful resistance to the arms of Persia after the revolt of Aristagoras in 498 BC. The Persian troops fell into an ambush which had been prepared for them, and were cut to pieces, together with their generals, Daurises, Amorges, and Sisimaces.

Notes

6th-century BC Greek people
5th-century BC Greek people
Ancient Greek generals
Ancient Mylasians
Ionian Revolt